The 1991 National Rowing Championships was the 20th edition of the National Championships, held from 19–21 July 1991 at the National Water Sports Centre in Holme Pierrepont, Nottingham.

Senior

Medal summary

Lightweight

Medal summary

Junior

Medal summary

Coastal

Medal summary 

Key

References 

British Rowing Championships
British Rowing Championships
British Rowing Championships